White Oak Creek is a  long 4th order tributary to the Banister River in Pittsylvania County, Virginia.

Variant names
According to the Geographic Names Information System, it has also been known historically as:
 Whiteoak Creek

Course 
White Oak Creek rises in a pond about 3 miles northeast of Whitmell, Virginia and then flows generally northeast to join the Banister River about 0.5 miles south-southwest of Tight Squeeze.

Watershed 
White Oak Creek drains  of area, receives about 45.8 in/year of precipitation, has a wetness index of 418.01, and is about 46% forested.

See also 
 List of Virginia Rivers

References 

Rivers of Virginia
Rivers of Pittsylvania County, Virginia
Tributaries of the Roanoke River